Saint-Connan is a commune in the Côtes-d'Armor department of Brittany in northwestern France.

It is known for its long history of wine making.

Population
Inhabitants of Saint-Connan are called saint-connanais in French.

See also
Communes of the Côtes-d'Armor department

References

External links

Communes of Côtes-d'Armor